Guldrupe is a populated area, a socken (not to be confused with parish), on the Swedish island of Gotland. It comprises the same area as the administrative Guldrupe District, established on 1January 2016.

Geography 
Guldrupe is situated in the central part of Gotland. The medieval Guldrupe Church is located in the socken. , Guldrupe Church belongs to Vänge parish in Romaklosters pastorat, along with the churches in Vänge, Buttle, Sjonhem, Viklau and Halla.

References

External links 

Objects from Guldrupe at the Digital Museum by Nordic Museum

Populated places in Gotland County